Bradfield Heath is a village in Essex, England. It is located in between the A120 road and the B1352 road.

It is the location of the former Bradfield Hall, which was demolished c.1955. Bradfield Hall was the home of Sir John Raynsford (c.1482-1559) (MP for Colchester and High Sheriff of Essex and Hertfordshire for 1537–38) and Sir Harbottle Grimston, 1st Baronet (c.1569–1648) (MP for Harwich and Essex and also High Sheriff). Sir Harbottle was a leading Parliamentarian during the Civil War.

External links

Villages in Essex
Tendring